John "Jack" Bailey (14 June 1871 – 26 October 1947) was an Australian politician.

Born in Manus Creek to farmer Thomas Henry Bailey and Rosanna Rielly Boyd, he left school early to work with his father as a shearer. On 29 November 1891 he married Esther Elphick at Tumut, with whom he had four children. He became an organiser with the Australian Workers' Union (AWU) in 1901, becoming federation vice-president and central branch president from 1914 to 1924. In 1918 he was elected to the New South Wales Legislative Assembly in a by-election for the seat of Monaro, representing the Labor Party; following the introduction of proportional representation in 1920 he was one of the members for Goulburn. He held the seat at the 1922 election.  In 1924 Bailey was expelled from the Labor Party in connection with a ballot box scandal. He saw out the remainder of his term as an independent and did not contest the 1925 election. He continued to be active in the union movement and was president of the New South Wales branch of the AWU in 1938. Bailey died at Stanmore in 1947.

References

 

1871 births
1947 deaths
Australian Labor Party members of the Parliament of New South Wales
Members of the New South Wales Legislative Assembly
Australian trade unionists